The MicroVAX is a discontinued family of low-cost minicomputers developed and manufactured by Digital Equipment Corporation (DEC). The first model, the MicroVAX I, was introduced in 1983. They used processors that implemented the VAX instruction set architecture (ISA) and were succeeded by the VAX 4000. Many members of the MicroVAX family had corresponding VAXstation variants, which primarily differ by the addition of graphics hardware. The MicroVAX family supports Digital's VMS and ULTRIX operating systems. Prior to VMS V5.0, MicroVAX hardware required a dedicated version of VMS named MicroVMS.

MicroVAX I
The MicroVAX I, code-named Seahorse, introduced in October 1984, was one of DEC's first VAX computers to use very-large-scale integration (VLSI) technology. The KA610 CPU module (also known as the KD32) contained two custom chips which implemented the ALU and FPU while TTL chips were used for everything else. Two variants of the floating point chips were supported, with the chips differing by the type of floating point instructions supported, F and G, or F and D. The system was implemented on two quad-height Q-bus cards - a Data Path Module (DAP) and Memory Controller (MCT). The MicroVAX I used Q-bus memory cards, which limited the maximum memory to 4MiB. The performance of the MicroVAX I was rated at 0.3 VUPs, equivalent to the earlier VAX-11/730.

MicroVAX II
The MicroVAX II, code-named Mayflower, was a mid-range MicroVAX introduced in May 1985 and shipped shortly thereafter. It ran VAX/VMS or, alternatively, ULTRIX, the DEC native Unix operating system. At least one non-DEC operating system was available, BSD Unix from MtXinu.

It used the KA630-AA CPU module, a quad-height Q22-Bus module, which featured a MicroVAX 78032 microprocessor and a MicroVAX 78132 floating-point coprocessor operating at 5 MHz (200 ns cycle time). Two gate arrays on the module implemented the external interface for the microprocessor, Q22-bus interface and the scatter-gather map for DMA transfers over the Q22-Bus. The module also contained 1 MB of memory, an interval timer, two ROMs for the boot and diagnostic facility, a DZ console serial line unit and a time-of-year clock. A 50-pin connector for a ribbon cable near the top left corner of the module provided the means by which more memory was added to the system.

The MicroVAX II supported 1 to 16 MB of memory through zero, one or two memory expansion modules. The MS630 memory expansion module was used for expanding memory capacity. Four variants of the MS630 existed: the 1 MB MS630-AA, 2 MB MS630-BA, 4 MB MS630-BB and the 8MB MS630-CA. The MS630-AA was a dual-height module, whereas the MS630-BA, MS630-BB and MS630-CA were quad-height modules. These modules used 256 Kb DRAMs and were protected by byte-parity, with the parity logic located on the module. The modules connected to the CPU module via the backplane through the C and D rows and a 50-conductor ribbon cable. The backplane served as the address bus and the ribbon cable as the data bus.

The MicroVAX II came in three models of enclosure:

 BA23
 BA123
 630QE - A deskside enclosure.

KA620 

KA620 referred to a single-board MicroVAX II designed for automatic test equipment and manufacturing applications which only ran DEC's real-time VAXELN operating system. A KA620 with 1 MB of memory bundled with the VAXELN Run-Time Package 2.3 was priced at US$5,000.

Mira 

Mira referred to a fault-tolerant configuration of the MicroVAX II developed by DEC's European Centre for Special Systems located in Annecy in France. The system consisted of two MicroVAX 78032 microprocessors, an active and standby microprocessor in a single box, connected by Ethernet and controlled by a software switch. When a fault was detected in the active microprocessor, the workload was switched over to the standby microprocessor.

Industrial VAX 630 

A MicroVAX II in BA213 enclosure.

MicroVAX III 

BA23- or BA123-enclosure MicroVAX upgraded with KA650 CPU module containing a CVAX chip set.

MicroVAX III+ 

BA23- or BA123-enclosure MicroVAX upgraded with KA655 CPU module.

VAX 4 

BA23- or BA123-enclosure MicroVAX upgraded with KA660 CPU module.

MicroVAX 2000 

The MicroVAX 2000, code-named TeamMate, was a low-cost MicroVAX introduced on 10 February 1987. In January 1987, the MicroVAX 2000 was the first VAX system targeted at both universities and VAX programmers who wanted to work from remote locations.

The MicroVAX 2000 used the same microprocessor and floating-point coprocessor as the MicroVAX II, but was feature reduced in order to lower the cost. Limitations were a reduced maximum memory capacity, 14 MB versus 16 MB in MicroVAX II systems and the lack of Q-Bus or any expansion bus. The system could have a Shugart-based harddrive with ST412 interface and MFM encoding and had a built in 5.25-inch floppy drive (named RX33 in DEC jargon) for software distribution and backup. Supported operating systems were VMS and ULTRIX. It was packaged in a desktop form factor.

MicroVAX 3100 Series 

The MicroVAX 3100 Series was introduced in 1987. These systems were all packaged in desktop enclosures.

MicroVAX 3100 Model 10
 Teammate II
 KA41-A, CVAX, 11.11 MHz (90 ns)

MicroVAX 3100 Model 10e
 Teammate II
 KA41-D, CVAX+, 16.67 MHz (60 ns)
 32 MB of memory maximum.

MicroVAX 3100 Model 20
 Teammate II
 KA41-A, CVAX, 11.11 MHz (90 ns)
 A Model 10 in larger enclosure.

MicroVAX 3100 Model 20e
 Teammate II
 KA41-D, CVAX+, 16.67 MHz (60 ns)
 A Model 10e in larger enclosure.

MicroVAX 3100 Model 30
 Waverley/S
 Entry-level model, developed in Ayr, Scotland
 Introduced: 12 October 1993
 KA45, SOC, 25 MHz (40 ns)
 32 MB of memory maximum.

MicroVAX 3100 Model 40
 Waverley/S
 Entry-level model, developed in Ayr, Scotland
 Introduced: 12 October 1993
 KA45, SOC, 25 MHz (40 ns)
 8 to 32 MB of memory
 A Model 30 in larger enclosure.

MicroVAX 3100 Model 80
 Waverley/M
 Entry-level model, developed in Ayr, Scotland
 Introduced: 12 October 1993
 KA47, Mariah, 50 MHz (20 ns), 256 KB external cache
 72 MB of memory maximum.

MicroVAX 3100 Model 85
 Waverley/M+
 Introduced: August 1994
 KA55, NVAX, 62.5 MHz (16 ns), 128 KB external cache
 16 to 128 MB of memory.

MicroVAX 3100 Model 88
 Waverley/M+
 Introduced: 8 October 1996
 Last order date: 30 September 2000
 Last ship date: 31 December 2000
 KA58, NVAX, 62.5 MHz (16 ns), 128 KB external cache
 64 to 512 MB of memory.

MicroVAX 3100 Model 90
 Cheetah
 Introduced: 12 October 1993
 Identical to the VAX 4000 Model 100, but uses SCSI instead of DSSI
 KA50, NVAX, 72 MHz (14 ns), 128 KB external cache
 128 MB of memory maximum.

MicroVAX 3100 Model 95
 Cheetah+
 Introduced: 12 April 1994
 Processor: KA51, NVAX, 83.34 MHz (12 ns), 512 KB external cache.

MicroVAX 3100 Model 96
 Cheetah++
 KA56, NVAX, 100 MHz (10 ns)
 16 to 128 MB of memory.

MicroVAX 3100 Model 98
 Cheetah++
 Introduced: 8 October 1996
 Last order date: 30 September 2000
 Last ship date: 31 December 2000
 KA59, NVAX, 100 MHz (10 ns), 512 KB external cache.

InfoServer 100/150/1000 General purpose storage server (disk, CD-ROM, tape and MOP boot server) related to MicroVAX 3100 Model 10, running custom firmware, KA41-C CPU.

Mayfair

MicroVAX 3500 and MicroVAX 3600 

The MicroVAX 3500 and MicroVAX 3600, code-named Mayfair, were introduced in September 1987 and were meant to be the higher end complement of the MicroVAX family. These new machines featured more than three times the performance of the MicroVAX II and supported 32 MB of ECC main memory (twice that of the MicroVAX II). The performance improvements over the MicroVAX II resulted from the increased clock rate of the CVAX chip set, which operated at 11.11 MHz (90 ns cycle time) along with a two-level, write-through caching architecture. It used the KA650 CPU module.

MicroVAX 3300 and MicroVAX 3400 

The MicroVAX 3300 and MicroVAX 3400, code-named Mayfair II, were entry-level to mid-range server computers introduced on 19 October 1988 intended to compete with the IBM AS/400. They used the KA640 CPU module.

MicroVAX 3800 and MicroVAX 3900
The MicroVAX 3800 and MicroVAX 3900, code-named Mayfair III, were introduced in April 1989. They were high-end models in the MicroVAX family, replacing the MicroVAX 3500 and MicroVAX 3600, and were intended to compete with the IBM AS/400. At introduction, the starting price of the MicroVAX 3800 was US$81,000 and that of the MicroVAX 3900 was US$120,200. A variant of the MicroVAX 3800, the rtVAX 3800, was intended for real-time computing (RTC) applications such as computer-aided manufacturing (CAM). These systems used the KA655 CPU module, which contained a 16.67 MHz (60 ns cycle time) CVAX chip set. They supported up to 64 MB of memory.

References 

DEC minicomputers
Computer-related introductions in 1984
32-bit computers

de:Virtual Address eXtension#Prozessor